Titti Astri Maartmann (27 September 1920 – 18 September 2018) was a Norwegian luger who competed in the late 1930s. She won a gold medal in the women's singles event at the 1937 European luge championships in Oslo, Norway. Living an active life, she still played golf at age 97. 

Her uncles were soccer players Erling Maartmann and Rolf Maartmann. Her great-grandfather was Norwegian politician Knud Geelmuyden Fleischer Maartmann. Her grandfather was Harald Sigvart Maartmann, the first Executive Director of Ringnes.

References

1920 births
2018 deaths
Norwegian female lugers